is a 1953 Japanese drama film directed by Shirō Toyoda. The film is based on Mori Ōgai's novel of the same name. Hideko Takamine stars as Otama, a young woman who becomes the mistress of a married man in order to support her aging father.

Plot
Otama is a young woman who has previously been married, though the man turned out to already have been married with a wife and child. Because of this Otama is considered a disgrace and finding a good match near impossible.

Feeling pressure to support her father who is frail, aging, and works to support them both by selling candy, Otama agrees to have dinner with a widowed kimono merchant who has offered to keep Otama as his mistress. Unbeknown to her, Suezō, the man she has agreed to meet, is in fact a still married moneylender and the arrangement between them has been set up to settle some debts of the matchmaker.

At a restaurant before she meets Suezō, Otama sees a handsome young student, Okada, who also notices her. Nevertheless the deal between Suezō and Otama goes forward and he installs her in a new home.

Otama tries to be a good mistress, but she has little feeling for Suezō. Through her maid she quickly comes to learn that her master is a moneylender and that the women of the neighbourhood have little respect for her. Suezō also inadvertently reveals that he still has a wife, and the two women later meet and recognize each other in the street based on items of clothing Suezō has given each of them. Nevertheless Otama feels obligated to stay, knowing that there is no other way for her to support herself or her father.

One day a snake attacks Otama's pet bird. Her maid calls for help, and Okada kills the snake and saves the bird. Otama follows Okada on his errands afterwards and sees him go to Suezō to obtain money before selling one of his textbooks, which she immediately buys back.

Suezō discovers the book and becomes suspicious. He says he will be staying in another town overnight.

Otama prepares a meal for Okada, intending to invite him in from his daily walk, but she finds that he is accompanied by a friend and she does not speak. Suezō returns unexpectedly, discovers the meal and tells her Okada is going away to Europe. She returns the book to the friend, who confirms the news.

Otama becomes resigned to her situation, and the film closes with her watching wild geese flying over water.

Cast
 Hideko Takamine as Otama
 Eizō Tanaka as Zenkichi
 Miki Odagiri as Oume
 Machiko Hamaji
 Eijirō Tono as Suezō
 Kumeko Urabe
 Hiroshi Akutagawa as Okada
 Jukichi Uno as Kimura
 Kuniko Miyake
 Chōko Iida

References

External links
 
 

1953 films
1953 drama films
Japanese black-and-white films
1950s Japanese-language films
Japanese drama films
1950s Japanese films